The 2010 Copa Sony Ericsson Colsanitas was a women's tennis tournament played on outdoor clay courts. It was the 13th edition of the Copa Sony Ericsson Colsanitas, and was on the International category of the 2010 WTA Tour. It took place at the Club Campestre El Rancho in Bogotá, Colombia, from 15 February through 21 February 2010. Unseeded Mariana Duque Mariño won the singles title.

Last year's finalist Gisela Dulko was the top-seeded player. Also in the field were 2008 semifinalist Carla Suárez Navarro, Italian Sara Errani, last year's semifinalist Patricia Mayr, Klára Zakopalová, Angelique Kerber, and Arantxa Parra Santonja.

Singles main draw entrants

Seeds

1 Rankings as of February 8, 2010.

Other entrants
The following players received wildcards into the main draw:

 Bianca Botto
 Catalina Castaño
 Paula Zabala

The following players received entry from the qualifying draw:

 Kristina Antoniychuk
 Gréta Arn
 Corinna Dentoni
 Laura Pous Tió

Doubles main draw entrants

Seeds

1 Rankings as of February 8, 2010.

Other entrants
The following pairs received wildcards into the doubles main draw:
  Bianca Botto /  Mariana Duque Mariño
  Martina Frantová /  Karen Ramírez Rivera

Finals

Singles

 Mariana Duque Mariño defeated  Angelique Kerber 6–4, 6–3
 It was Duque Mariño's first career title.

Doubles

 Gisela Dulko /  Edina Gallovits defeated  Olga Savchuk /  Anastasiya Yakimova 6–2, 7–6(8–6)

External links
 Official website

Copa Sony Ericsson Colsanitas
Copa Colsanitas
February 2010 sports events in South America
2010 in Colombian tennis